Eugenio Giani (born 30 June 1959 in Empoli) is an Italian politician.

He started his political activity in the Italian Socialist Party and he was active in the City council of Florence, of which he became president in 2009. He became a member of the Democratic Party the same year.

At the 2015 Tuscan regional election he obtained 10,505 personal preferences only in the city of Florence, and on 25 June 2015 he was elected President of the Regional Council of Tuscany.

He was elected President of Tuscany in the 2020 regional election, and became the oldest President-elect at the age of 61. He officially swore in as President on 8 October 2020.

Footnotes

External links

1959 births
Living people
21st-century Italian politicians
Members of the Regional Council of Tuscany
Presidents of Tuscany